Ariadne pagenstecheri, the Pagenstecher's castor or scalloped castor, is a butterfly in the family Nymphalidae. It is found in Nigeria, Cameroon, the Central African Republic, southern Sudan, Uganda, Rwanda, Burundi, western Kenya, north-western Tanzania and the eastern and central parts of the Democratic Republic of the Congo. The habitat consists of the margins of sub-montane and montane forests.

The larvae feed on Tragia brevipes.

References

Butterflies described in 1904
Biblidinae